is a feminine Japanese given name.

Possible writings
Rieko can be written using different kanji characters and can mean:
理恵子, "logic, blessing, child"
梨枝子, "pear, branch, child"
利恵子, "profit, blessing, child"
里江子, "hometown, creek, child"
理絵子, "logic, picture, child"
理枝子, "logic, branch, child"
The name can also be written in hiragana or katakana.

People
 Rieko Ito (利恵子), a member of the J-pop band Round Table
 Rieko Kodama (理恵子), a Japanese video game designer
 Rieko Miura (理恵子), a J-pop singer and actress
 Rieko Miyoshi (里絵子), a Japanese singer/songwriter and pianist under the stage name Kotringo
 Rieko Nakagawa (中川李枝子), a Japanese children's book writer and lyricist
 Rieko Yoshihara (理恵子), a Japanese author
 Rieko Ioane, a New Zealand rugby union player

Fictional characters
 Rieko, an android in the manga, tokusatsu, and anime series Kikaider

Japanese feminine given names